William N. Fenton (December 15, 1908 – June 17, 2005) was an American scholar and writer known for his extensive studies of Iroquois history and culture. He started his studies of the Iroquois in the 1930s and published a number of significant works over the following decades.  His final work was published in 2002. During his career, Fenton was director of the New York State Museum and a professor of anthropology at the State University of New York.

Early career (1908–1955)
Fenton was born William Nelson Fenton in New Rochelle, New York, in 1908.  The Fenton family had had interactions with the Seneca people since the 1860s. He grew up in the west of New York State, where the Seneca had their traditional territory. After attending local schools, he studied at Dartmouth College, where he graduated in 1931.  He went on for graduate study and earned a doctorate in anthropology from Yale University in 1937. (From 1935 until he received his doctorate in 1937, Fenton was also a community worker for the New York Indian Service. He mainly worked on the Tonawanda Reservation).

During the 1930s, Fenton lived among the Seneca in western New York, becoming fluent in their language and doing field studies. The Seneca nation adopted Fenton into the Hawk clan on January 26, 1934.  This was the same clan that had adopted Lewis Henry Morgan.

Fenton soon became known as a leader of studies of the Iroquois. Fenton wrote a number of position papers during the 1940s and 1950s that outlined problems and issues relating to Iroquois studies which required further work.  He encouraged other students of the Iroquois to meet and discuss issues of concern in the field, notably in meetings at Red House in New York. Fenton focused attention on such issues as diversity in culture and connections between northern and southern tribes.

In his work as an ethnologist with the Smithsonian Institution's Bureau of American Ethnology, Fenton drew attention to existing historic and ethnographic sources. During the 1930s and 1940s, Fenton undertook substantial studies of Iroquois music and dance while working at the Smithsonian.

It has been noted that Fenton's career saw profound changes in anthropological methods and how research was perceived, with "the patron-client relationships of anthropologist and "informant" ... greeted with increasing suspicion by young Iroquois after the 1950s". Furthermore, Fenton's classic work was carried out when "...Iroquois ceremonialists were worried about the potential loss of their knowledge and delighted in having someone who wanted to listen and to record it".

Later career (1956–2005)
After becoming senior ethnologist at the Smithsonian Institution in the 1950s, and then serving as executive secretary for anthropology and psychology at the National Research Council, he went to work at the New York State Museum at Albany in 1954. Becoming director, he developed an extensive collection of Iroquois materials.  Some tribal representatives criticized Fenton for failing to return artifacts.  He regarded museums as necessary safeguards for cultural heritage.  Some tribal leaders also criticized him for revealing too much material about sacred rituals.

Fenton chaired the Committee on Anthropological Research in Museums (CARM) from 1965 to 1973, during the majority of its life.  CARM, a subcommittee of the American Anthropological Association, encouraged scholarly use of museums and museum collections in anthropological research.  CARM also encouraged the early use of computers in documenting and inventorying museums collections across North America.  In 1965 Fenton was awarded the Cornplanter Medal.

Fenton left the New York State Museum to become Professor of Anthropology at the State University of New York at Albany.  He worked there until his retirement in 1979.  He remained active in continued research and writing about the Iroquois.  He published The Great Law and the Longhouse: A Political History of the Iroquois in 1998 when he was nearly 90.

He died on June 17, 2005 in Cooperstown, New York, at the age of 96, on the way to the hospital.

Honours 
Fenton served as President of a number of academic societies: the American Folklore Society (1959-1960), the American Ethnological Society (1959), and the American Society for Ethnohistory (1961).

He was also a member of a number of committees, including the Phillips Fund Committee of the American Philosophical Society (1975-1991) and of the American Committee of the Permanent Council of the International Congress of Anthropological and Ethnological Sciences (1952-1972).

Publications
Fenton wrote extensively on Iroquois ethnology, historiography, the history of anthropology, and museum anthropology for several decades. Some of his works include:

 Fenton, William N (1936). An outline of Seneca ceremonies at Coldspring longhouse. New Haven; London: Yale University Press ; Humphrey Milford, Oxford University Press. OCLC 898849862.

 Fenton, William N. (1942), Songs from the Iroquois longhouse: from the Archive of the American Folk Song (in Iroquoian), Washington, D.C.: Library of Congress, Division of Music, Recording Laboratory, 1942, OCLC 977773150, retrieved March 3, 2022

See also 
 George Heron

References

External links
 William Fenton interview, Oral History Collection — University of Florida

1908 births
2005 deaths
American folklorists
Writers from New Rochelle, New York
20th-century American anthropologists
Presidents of the American Folklore Society